Tim Väyrynen (born 30 March 1993) is a Finnish professional footballer who plays as a striker for FC Vaduz in the Swiss Challenge League. Väyrynen was born in Espoo, Finland. He began his senior club career playing for Honka, before signing with Borussia Dortmund II at age 20 in 2014.

Väyrynen made his international debut for Finland in October 2013, at the age of 20 and has since had over 10 caps, including appearing in UEFA Euro 2016 qualifying.

Club career

FC Honka
He was selected as the Player of the Month for June 2013 and October 2013 and to the Team of the Month for June, September and October 2013 in Veikkausliiga.

Väyrynen finished the season as the top goal scorer with 17 league goals in 24 appearances for the 2013 Veikkausliiga. At the end of the season, he was officially selected as the striker of the year and the player of the year 2013.

Borussia Dortmund II
On 10 January 2014, he joined reserve side Borussia Dortmund II for an undisclosed fee. On 22 February, Väyrynen scored on his 3. Liga debut against MSV Duisburg.

Viktoria Köln
On 30 January 2015, Väyrynen left Dortmund II and joined fourth tier Regionalliga West side Viktoria Köln on loan for the remainder of the 2014–15 season. On 14 February, he scored in his league debut against SV Rödinghausen.

Dynamo Dresden
On 3 July 2015, he joined Dynamo Dresden. On 25 July 2015, Väyrynen scored on his Dynamo Dresden 3. Liga debut against Stuttgart II besides assisting two goals. During season 2015–16 he gained 14 caps and scored 3 goals.

Hansa Rostock
On 19 January 2017 it was announced that Väyrynen had signed a contract with Hansa Rostock.

Roda
After two seasons in Hansa on Väyrynen joined Roda JC on a one-year contract with an option for two more years.

KuPS
On 2 August 2021, he signed a contract with KuPS until the end of 2022.

International career

Youth

Väyrynen scored a hat-trick when Finland U21 beat Wales U21 5-1 in Bangor 14 August 2013 in UEFA U21 qualifications.

Senior

He made his debut for the Finnish national team on 30 October 2013 in a friendly match in Qualcomm Stadium, San Diego against Mexico when he replaced Mikael Forssell as a substitute for the second half. He made his second appearance for Finland national football team in match against Czech Republic on 21 May 2014. He made his UEFA European Championship qualification match debut on 7 September 2015 in a match against Faroe Islands when he entered as a 74th minute substitute for Riku Riski.

Personal life 

His father is former Finnish league striker Mika Väyrynen (not to be confused with the Finnish international Mika Väyrynen).

Career statistics

Club

International

Honours and achievements

Club

Honka
 Finnish Cup: 2012
 Finnish League Cup: 2010, 2011
 Veikkausliiga: Runner-up 2013

Viktoria Köln
 Middle Rhine Cup: 2015

Dynamo Dresden
3. Liga: 2016

Hansa Rostock
Mecklenburg-Vorpommern Cup: 2017, 2018

Individual
 Veikkausliiga Player of the Year 2013
 Veikkausliiga Top Scorer 2013
 Veikkausliiga Striker of the Year  2013
Veikkausliiga Team of the Year 2021
 Finland national under-21 football team Player of the Year 2013

References

External links

 
 
 
 Why You Should Have Heard Of Tim Väyrynen at The Inside Left
 

1993 births
Living people
Finnish footballers
Finland youth international footballers
Finland under-21 international footballers
Finland international footballers
Association football forwards
FC Honka players
Borussia Dortmund II players
FC Viktoria Köln players
Dynamo Dresden players
FC Hansa Rostock players
Roda JC Kerkrade players
Helsingin Jalkapalloklubi players
KF Tirana players
Kuopion Palloseura players
Veikkausliiga players
3. Liga players
2. Bundesliga players
Eerste Divisie players
Kategoria Superiore players
Finnish expatriate footballers
Expatriate footballers in Germany
Finnish expatriate sportspeople in Germany
Expatriate footballers in the Netherlands
Finnish expatriate sportspeople in the Netherlands
Expatriate footballers in Albania
Finnish expatriate sportspeople in Albania
Footballers from Espoo